"One Boy, One Girl" is a song written by Mark Alan Springer and Shaye Smith, and recorded by American country music singer Collin Raye.  It was released in July 1995 as the first single from his album, I Think About You.  It peaked at #2 in the United States and #4 in Canada. It also peaked at #87 on the Billboard Hot 100.

Content
The song's narrator talks about the virtues of one boy, and one girl...from their meeting and courtship, then their marriage, then their birth of their twins (which just so happen to be one boy and one girl).  The video shows Raye at a campfire with the parents and their twins and a few others.

Music video
The music video for the song consisted of Collin Raye singing the song to a group of people around the campfire at night.

Chart positions

Year-end charts

References

1995 singles
1995 songs
Collin Raye songs
Songs written by Mark Alan Springer
Songs written by Shaye Smith
Song recordings produced by Paul Worley
Epic Records singles